Romantic Warrior is the sixth studio album by the American jazz fusion band Return to Forever, released in 1976 by Columbia Records. After releasing their previous album, No Mystery (1975), their fourth for Polydor Records, the group moved to Columbia and retreated to Caribou Ranch near Nederland, Colorado to record their next album. It was also their first to be credited solely to Return to Forever, removing the "featuring Chick Corea" tag. The album is more avant-garde and less funky than No Mystery, and remains the band's highest selling album with over 500,000 copies sold in the US.

Production

Recording 

Romantic Warrior was recorded in February 1976 at Caribou Ranch, located near Nederland, Colorado.

Music 
Chick Corea contributed the longest compositions while the other members each composed one piece. The opener, "Medieval Overture", with its distinctive melodic motifs, sets the mood for the rest of the album. Lenny White's "Sorceress" starts with a funky riff and is distinguished by Corea's synthesizers. The title track, "The Romantic Warrior", is fully acoustic. It has a long intro, which is followed by a short theme consisting of one riff. Each group member, excluding White, plays a long solo. An extended outro follows, during which fast unison patterns are heard.

On side two, Al Di Meola's song, "Majestic Dance", relies on rock riffs and distorted lead guitar sound, and features fast harpsichord-like synth figures. Clarke's "The Magician" is a  complex composition, featuring playful melodies, and rapid unison lines. The last track of the album is Corea's "Duel of the Jester and the Tyrant", the longest song on the album. It has a more conventional melody as a main theme, but follows the style of previous tracks. Notable is the intense keyboard solo showcasing Corea.

After this album Corea decided that the group's time had come to an end and he continued with a new Return to Forever line-up with Clarke. Corea dedicated the album to the founder of the Church of Scientology, L. Ron Hubbard.

Critical reception 

In a retrospective review for AllMusic, William Ruhlmann praised Romantic Warrior as "the sound of a mature band at the top of its game, which may help explain why it was Return to Forever's most popular album, eventually certified as a gold record, and the last by this assemblage." In another retrospective review for Sputnikmusic, Brendan Schroer argued that the "true magic of the collective’s work was in how these musicians could work off each other and make something both emotionally resonant and musically abstruse"  and opined that "Romantic Warrior plays out as a wonderful - if slightly flawed - melding of incredible technical feats and inner-band chemistry".

Noted rock-fusion-despising critic Robert Christgau was less enthusiastic about the record. In Christgau's Record Guide: Rock Albums of the Seventies (1981), he called it "jazz-rock's answer to Emerson, Lake & Palmer--the worst of both worlds"; and Corea's compositions "pompous", faux classical; while deriding certain members of his group's playing as being on display "in all their dazzling vacuity".

Chart performance

Track listing

Personnel 
Return to Forever
 Chick Corea – acoustic piano, Fender Rhodes electric piano, Hohner Clavinet,  Yamaha YC45d organ, synthesizers (ARP Odyssey, Micromoog, Minimoog, Moog 15 modular, Polymoog), marimba, percussion
 Al Di Meola – electric guitars, acoustic guitar, soprano guitar, handbells, slide whistle
 Stanley Clarke – Alembic electric bass with Instant Flanger, piccolo bass, acoustic bass, bell tree, handbells
 Lenny White – drums, timpani, congas, timbales, snare drums, suspended cymbals, alarm clock, handbells

Technical personnel
 Chick Corea – production
 Al Di Meola – assistant production
 Stanley Clarke – assistant production
 Lenny White – assistant production
 Dennis MacKay – recording engineer, remixing
 Tom Likes – assistant engineer
 Wilson McLean – cover art
 Gerard Huerta – logo
 Remixed at Trident Studios, London

References

External links 
 Return to Forever Romantic Warrior (1976) album review by William Ruhlmann, credits & releases at AllMusic
 Return to Forever Romantic Warrior (1976) album releases & credits at Discogs
 Return to Forever Romantic Warrior (1976) album to be listened as stream on Spotify

1976 albums
Columbia Records albums
Return to Forever albums